Wisteria Lodge may refer to:

 Wisteria Lodge (Reading, Massachusetts), a historic house
 "The Adventure of Wisteria Lodge", a Sherlock Holmes story